Aphyocypris kikuchii is a species of cyprinid fish. It is endemic to Taiwan. It is a benthopelagic freshwater fish that grows to  total length.

Named in honor of Yonetaro Kikuchi (1869-1921), collector for the Taipei Museum in Formosa (Taiwan), who collected the type specimen.

References

Cyprinidae
Cyprinid fish of Asia
Freshwater fish of Taiwan
Endemic fauna of Taiwan
Taxa named by Masamitsu Ōshima
Fish described in 1919